Green Ginger is a European theatre company based in Bristol, UK and Wiseppe, France that creates adult-oriented theatre and films featuring puppetry. Founded by Terry Lee in 1978, the company regularly tours its theatre productions throughout the world.
Green Ginger collaborates with major arts organisations, including Welsh National Opera and Aardman Animations and its members teach at University of Bristol, Bath Spa University and the Royal Welsh College of Music & Drama.

Green Ginger has two artistic directors: Terry Lee who oversees the production of short puppet films in the company's French base; whilst Chris Pirie is responsible for its production base in Bristol, UK. Film Director Terry Gilliam became patron of Green Ginger in 2001.

Productions
A Television Show (1978), Mack the Giant Thriller (1980), The Last Resort (1981), The Story So Far; The Beginning (1984), The Story So Far; Before the Beginning (1986), Gaston le Gouache (1987), Madame Zero (1989), Frank Einstein; Born to be Wired (1993), Boris the Eurobot (1994), PRATs (1996), Slaphead; Demon Barber (1996), Gaston and Pedro (1998), Bambi - The Wilderness Years (2000), Frank Einstein – Rewired (2001), Rust (2005), Mac et le Geant (2007), Zelda (2009), Le Drame des Autres (2012), Lionel the Vinyl (2013), Outpost (2014), Petit'Tom (2016), Intronauts (2018).

Intronauts (2018) was its 21st original production and marked the company's 40th anniversary. The touring show, directed by Emma Williams and with an original soundscore by composer Simon Preston, was inspired by cult 60s sci-fi movies and portrayed a dystopian future where those with disposable income could buy have miniaturised human cleaners injected into their bodies to carry out routine maintenance and healthcare.
In 2016, Green Ginger provided design and movement consultancy during the creation of 4 metre-long mini-spiders for Arcadia Spectacular's Metamorphosis show.

References 

"Theatre: There's more to puppets than Sooty and Sweep" Dominic Cavendish in The Independent, 28 Oct 1998
New Welsh Review, No. 49, p. 70
Lyn Gardner in The Guardian, 28 Feb 2001
BRUNIMA Bulletin (The Journal of British UNIMA) 107, July 2001
Dreams: The Terry Gilliam Fanzine https://www.gilliamdreams.com/cpirie02.htm  Gilliam interview with Chris Pirie, May 2002

External links 
 Green Ginger web site

Puppet troupes
1978 establishments in England
Puppetry in the United Kingdom